Birgitte Einarsen is a Norwegian singer and musical theatre artist from Helgeroa in Larvik, Vestfold county. She was born in 1975. Birgitte has performed in popular musicals like Grease, Fame and The Little Shop of Horrors. She has also done the show My First, My Last, My Everything.

She became famous both in Norway and abroad in 2003, following her performance in that year's Melodi Grand Prix, which is used to select the Norwegian entry for the Eurovision Song Contest.  Her entry was the uptempo disco song Good Evening, Europe!, which is the phrase used every year when the ESC hosts address millions of viewers across Europe.  As the title, almost all the lyrics were a reference to the Song Contest, usually direct quotes from past Eurovision entries, or else from other songs sung by former Eurovision participants.  The song was written by Arve Furset, who also composed the winning song by Jostein Hasselgård.

In 2006, Birgitte sang again, in Melodi Grand Prix 2006, performing another disco tune, Saturday.  Her entry did not win direct entrance to the national final, but going through the Second Chance round, it did ultimately qualify.  Singing in the grand final, she failed to make the top four.

See also
Melodi Grand Prix 2006
Good Evening, Europe!

External links
Listen to Saturday
NRK presents Birgitte Einarsen (in Norwegian)
MGP official site

1975 births
Living people
Melodi Grand Prix contestants
21st-century Norwegian singers
21st-century Norwegian women singers
Musicians from Larvik